This is a list of the 100 busiest airports in Europe, ranked by total passengers per year, including both terminal and transit passengers. Data is for 2021 with a partial population of 2022 as statistics are released and is sourced individually for each airport and from a variety of sources, but normally the national aviation authority statistics, or those of the airport operator. 

The tables also show the percentage change in total passengers for each airport over the last year. Lists of the rankings for every year since 2010 are also presented. 

2020 and 2021 numbers are significantly reduced compared to 2019 due to the COVID-19 pandemic, which has caused a significant reduction in passenger numbers and aircraft movements.

Evolution in graph

2022

2021

2020

2019

2018

2017

2016

2010–2015

Gallery

See also

 Busiest airports by continent
 List of busiest airports by aircraft movements
 List of busiest airports by cargo traffic
 List of busiest airports by international passenger traffic
 List of busiest airports by passenger traffic
 List of busiest city airport systems by passenger traffic
 List of the busiest airports in the Baltic states
 List of the busiest airports in the European Union
 List of the busiest airports in the former Soviet Union
 List of the busiest airports in the Nordic countries
 List of busiest passenger air routes#Europe
 A map showing the passenger turnover of the major European airports in 2018.

Busiest airports by country

 List of the busiest airports in Argentina
 List of the busiest airports in Australia
 List of the busiest airports in Brazil
 List of the busiest airports in Canada
 List of the busiest airports in China
 List of the busiest airports in Croatia
 List of the busiest airports in France
 List of the busiest airports in Germany
 List of the busiest airports in Greece
 List of the busiest airports in India
 List of the busiest airports in Indonesia
 List of the busiest airports in the Republic of Ireland
 List of the busiest airports in Italy
 List of the busiest airports in Japan
 List of the busiest airports in New Zealand
 List of the busiest airports in Poland
 List of the busiest airports in Portugal
 List of the busiest airports in Romania
 List of the busiest airports in Russia
 List of the busiest airports in South Korea
 List of the busiest airports in Spain
 List of the busiest airports in Turkey
 List of the busiest airports in Ukraine
 List of the busiest airports in the United Kingdom
 List of the busiest airports in the United States

Notes

References

Europe
 
Aviation in Europe
 Busiest